Zdravko Lazarov (born 20 February 1976) is a Bulgarian professional football coach and a former player.

Lazarov's professional playing career as a winger spanned nearly 30 years, during which he played for 15 different clubs in Bulgaria, Turkey and Russia.

Lazarov was capped 31 times for the Bulgarian national team, scoring 3 times. He appeared in the 2004 UEFA European Championship.

Career
Lazarov started his career in his home town Septemvri in the local team FC Locomotiv Septemvri. After that, Lazarov played for Chardafon Gabrovo (now FC Yantra). After two very good seasons, he signed with Bulgarian grand CSKA Sofia. He did not impress with his performance and was sold to Minyor Pernik. In June 1998, Lazarov signed with the other Bulgarian grand Levski Sofia. Between 1999 and 2001 he played for Slavia Sofia. After that, he went in the Turkish Süper Lig where he played for Kocaelispor, Gaziantepspor and Kayseri Erciyesspor. For six seasons in Turkey he played in 202 games and scored 76 goals.

In July 2007, Zdravko returned in Bulgaria and signed with Slavia Sofia. After spending half a season with Slavia and participating in 11 games, in which he scored 8 goals, in December 2007, he signed with the Russian side Shinnik Yaroslavl. In 2008, he returned to Bulgaria, playing for CSKA Sofia once more. He scored 2 goals in 15 games before getting sidelined for six months due to an injury in the game against Litex Lovech. On 11 June 2009 he terminated his contract with CSKA with immediate effect after a meeting with the club's bosses.

On 15 June 2009, Lazarov signed with Cherno More Varna for two years. He took number 11, which at that time was worn by Georgi Kakalov, but Kakalov stepped it back to Lazarov. He made his team début on 7 July, in a friendly game against Levski Sofia.

In January 2010, Lazarov completed his move to Lokomotiv Plovdiv on a free transfer. He made his league debut for Lokomotiv on 27 February in a 3–2 away loss against CSKA Sofia, scoring a two penalties. Lazarov was promoted to club captain at the start of the 2010–11 season. During the entire season, he scored 14 goals in the league. On 15 March 2012, Lazarov scored the winning goal against Levski Sofia (in the extra time) in a 1/4 final match of the Bulgarian Cup. On 7 August 2012, his contract was terminated.

Two days later, Lazarov joined Slavia Sofia for the third time in his career.

Lazarov player for Hebar Pazardzhik for one season but left the club in June 2017.

Managerial career
In 2016–17 season, Lazarov was the playing assistant manager of Bulgarian Third League side Hebar Pazardzhik.

On 27 August 2018, Lazarov was appointed manager of Bulgarian Third League club Vihren Sandanski. In his first season, he led the club to third place in the South-West Third League.

Career statistics

Club

National team

International goals
Scores and results list Bulgaria's goal tally first.

Honours

Club
 Kocaelispor
 Turkish Cup (1): 2001–02

 Kayseri Erciyesspor
 Turkish Cup Runner-up: 2006–07

References

External links
 
 
 Zdravko Lazarov at LevskiSofia.info
 

1976 births
Living people
Bulgarian footballers
Bulgaria international footballers
Bulgarian expatriate footballers
FC Yantra Gabrovo players
PFC CSKA Sofia players
PFC Minyor Pernik players
PFC Levski Sofia players
PFC Slavia Sofia players
Kocaelispor footballers
Gaziantepspor footballers
Kayseri Erciyesspor footballers
FC Shinnik Yaroslavl players
Russian Premier League players
PFC Cherno More Varna players
PFC Lokomotiv Plovdiv players
FC Montana players
FC Hebar Pazardzhik players
First Professional Football League (Bulgaria) players
Süper Lig players
UEFA Euro 2004 players
Expatriate footballers in Turkey
Bulgarian expatriate sportspeople in Turkey
Expatriate footballers in Russia
Association football forwards
Bulgarian football managers
OFC Vihren Sandanski managers